David Warren DeGraaf (born April 4, 1971 in Spring Arbor, Michigan) is an American former handball player who competed in the 1996 Summer Olympics.

Career
The United States Air Force Academy originally recruited him for football. But he played for the USAFA Team Handball.

He played at the 1994 Goodwill Games (6th place out of 6), Pan American Games 1955 (4th of 6) & 1999 (4th of 7) and the 1996 Summer Olympics (9th of 12).

At the 1996 Summer Olympics he scored record 13 goals against Kuwait and a record of seven blocked shots. Only Niclas Ekberg was able to score 13 goals at the Olympic Games in 2012.

In 1997 he was selected as 1996 United States Air Force Athlete of the Year.

Awards

References

1971 births
Living people
American male handball players
Olympic handball players of the United States
Handball players at the 1996 Summer Olympics
Air Force Falcons team handball
United States Air Force World Class Athlete Program
United States Air Force Athlete of the Year
Competitors at the 1994 Goodwill Games
20th-century American people